Tony Beckett (born 26 June 1960) is a former Australian rules footballer who played with the Brisbane Bears in the Victorian Football League (VFL).

Beckett, a left footer, started out at Everton Districts before joining Queensland Football League (QFL) side Mayne. A wingman, he was a member of Mayne's 1982 premiership team. Beckett was Queensland interstate representative on 18 occasions and captained his state in 1985.
 
Beckett got his opportunity to play VFL football in 1987, when local club Brisbane entered the league and he was the first player recruited locally to debut. His first appearance came in round five against Melbourne at Carrara Oval and he had 19 disposals as well as a goal. Beckett played just five more senior games for the Bears.

References

1960 births
Australian rules footballers from Queensland
Brisbane Bears players
Mayne Australian Football Club players
Living people